Helena Mary Pycior (born 1947) is an American historian known for her works in the history of mathematics, Marie Curie, and human-animal relations. She is a professor emerita of history at the University of Wisconsin–Madison.

Education
Pycior has a master's degree in mathematics and a Ph.D. in history, both from Cornell University. Her 1976 doctoral dissertation was titled The Role of Sir William Rowan Hamilton in the Development of British Modern Algebra.

Books
Pycior is the author of the book Symbols, Impossible Numbers, and Geometric Entanglements: British Algebra Through the Commentaries on Newton's Universal Arithmetick (Cambridge University Press, 1997), and the coeditor of Creative Couples in the Sciences (with Nancy G. Slack and Pnina G. Abir-Am, Rutgers University Press, 1996).

References

1947 births
Living people
20th-century American mathematicians
21st-century American mathematicians
American women mathematicians
American historians of mathematics
Cornell University alumni
University of Wisconsin–Madison
20th-century American women
21st-century American women
American women historians